Manaia may refer to:

Manaia (mythological creature), a bird-headed mythological creature and symbol of protection in Māori mythology

Places
Manaia, Taranaki, a town in the South Taranaki District of New Zealand
Manaia, Waikato, a town on the Coromandel Peninsula of New Zealand
Manaia River, a river of the Coromandel Peninsula, New Zealand
Mount Manaia is a landmark on the Whangarei Heads, Northland, New Zealand
Manaia View School, Whangarei, Northland, New Zealand

People
Manaia (legendary chief), a chief of Hawaiki in Māori mythology
Wiremu Hukunui Manaia (died 1892), New Zealand tribal leader
Manaia Cherrington (born 1994), New Zealand rugby league footballer
Manaia Salavea (born 1986), Samoan rugby union footballer